Mesosa blairi is a species of beetle in the family Cerambycidae. It was described by Stephan von Breuning in 1935. It is known from Java and Malaysia.

References

blairi
Beetles described in 1935